Kim Jardine (born April 12, 1966) is an educator, entrepreneur and former political figure in New Brunswick, Canada. She represented Miramichi Centre in the Legislative Assembly of New Brunswick from 1999 to 2003 as a Progressive Conservative member.

She was born in Saint John, New Brunswick and was educated at the University of New Brunswick. Jardine served in the province's Executive Council as Minister of Environment and Minister of Environment and Local Government. She was defeated in a bid for reelection in 2003. In 2007, Jardine married Jeannot Volpé, another former member of Lord's cabinet.

References 
 List of Women MLAs, New Brunswick Legislative Library (pdf)

1966 births
Living people
Politicians from Saint John, New Brunswick
Progressive Conservative Party of New Brunswick MLAs
Women MLAs in New Brunswick
21st-century Canadian politicians
21st-century Canadian women politicians